Danny Cocke is an American professional film, trailer and advertising music composer. His credits contain scores to films such as The Devil's in the Details, as well as high-profile big-budget trailers such as The Hobbit: The Battle of the Five Armies, The Amazing Spider-Man, Snow White and the Huntsman, The Girl with the Dragon Tattoo, Star Trek Into Darkness, Captain America: The First Avenger, Thor: The Dark World, Parkland, Oblivion, The Raven and more. He resides in Los Angeles, California.

Early life
Danny Cocke began composing and playing guitar, bass and drums at the age of 12. Over the years, his musical path has evolved from playing in various bands into producing and recording for other bands/artists, while also writing his own music. 
 
At age 22, Cocke was diagnosed with stage IV testicular cancer, after being sent to the emergency room due to a severe pain in the back that occurred during a band rehearsal. As a result, he moved in with his parents and his chemotherapy treatment lasted for a year. Even though during this time he had to put his musical career on hold, he found the whole experience life-changing and took it as a gift. Being a cancer survivor, he volunteered and helped a lot of patients at the University of California, Davis hospital. During his 2012 interview with Trailer Music News, he said "if I was offered the choice to go back I would go through the whole cancer experience again just to be who I am today."

Trailer music and film scoring career
During his treatment, Cocke focused on expanding his composition and music programming skills. After overcoming cancer, he decided to pursue a career in the motion picture and video game advertising industry. With the help of his manager, who was connected to a few trailer houses in Los Angeles, Cocke started working on trailer scores, which led to numerous placements in major Hollywood advertising campaigns.
 
In 2011, Cocke released From the Blue, an album of short dramatic tracks, through L.A.-based licensing and publishing company RipTide Music. The album was created during a period of economic struggle and became very successful. Later in 2012, he released his second trailer music album, Verge of Total Chaos, which was published by Position Music. As of June 2017, Cocke has released four albums for Position Music.
 
Cocke's music has been featured in numerous high-profile movie trailers, including but not limited to: The Hobbit: The Battle of the Five Armies, The Maze Runner, The Amazing Spider-Man, Snow White and the Huntsman, The Girl with the Dragon Tattoo, Star Trek Into Darkness, Captain America: The First Avenger, Thor, Thor: The Dark World, Parkland, Oblivion, The Machine, Green Lantern, Bridge of Spies, The Raven, The Purge: Anarchy, and Runner, Runner.

Furthermore, his music has been used in multiple video game trailers such as: Titanfall 2, The Witcher 3, Call of Duty: Advanced Warfare, Assassin's Creed: Black Flag, Halo: Nightfall, Call of Duty: Modern Warfare 3 and more.

In 2012, Cocke was hired to score his first feature film, The Devil's in the Details, directed by Waymon Boone.

Later in 2015, his track Hunters Vs Monster was featured in the opening cinematic from the video game Evolve.

Cocke was nominated for Best Song/Score in the Trailer category during the 2014 Hollywood Music in Media Awards.

In 2016, Cocke was invited to BMI's Annual Master Conducting Workshop (a program which only accepts eight composers).

Cocke's music has been featured in numerous TV Shows and promos as well, such as Catfish, The Walking Dead, Daredevil and more.

In 2018, Cocke created the theme used in the Tom Clancy's Rainbow Six Siege invitational Esports competition.

Additionally, Cocke composed the theme song for the Runner's World's podcast, Human Race.

Discography
RipTide Music albums
 From the Blue (2011)

Position Music albums
 Verge of Total Chaos (2012)
 Darkness Devours (2013)
 Generate, Organize, Destroy (2016)
 Starchaser'' (2017)

See also
 Trailer music
 Film score
 2WEI

References

External links
 Official website
 
 Position Music profile

American film score composers
Living people
Year of birth missing (living people)